DIBOL or Digital's Business Oriented Language is a general-purpose, procedural, imperative programming language that was designed for use in Management Information Systems (MIS) software development. It was developed from 1970 to 1993.

DIBOL has a syntax similar to FORTRAN and BASIC, along with BCD arithmetic. It shares the COBOL program structure of separate data and procedure divisions. Unlike Fortran's numeric labels (for GOTO), DIBOL's were alphanumeric;
 the language supported a counterpart to computed goto.

History
DIBOL was originally marketed by Digital Equipment Corporation (DEC) in 1970.

The original version, DIBOL-8, was produced for PDP-8 systems running COS-300. The PDP-8-like DECmate II, supports the COS-310 Commercial Operating System, featuring DIBOL.

DIBOL-11 was developed for the PDP-11 running COS-350 operating system. It also ran on RSX-11, RT-11, and from 1978 on RSTS/E. DIBOL-32 runs on VMS systems, although it can also be used on other systems through emulators.

ANSI Standards were released in 1983, 1988 and 1992 (ANSI X3.165-1992). The 1992 standard was revised in 2002.

DIBOL compilers were developed by several other companies, including DBL from DISC (later Synergex), Softbol from Omtool, and Unibol from Software Ireland, Ltd.  Development of DIBOL effectively ceased after 1993, when an agreement between DEC and DISC replaced DIBOL with DBL on OpenVMS, Digital UNIX, and SCO Unix.

An alternative
Rather than code either DIBOL or COBOL, an alternative was to use Business Controls Corporation's SB-5 package, which could generate COBOL code for the PDP-11, DECsystem-10/DECSYSTEM-20. or VAX, including an option for COBOL inserts and overrides.

See also
 Timeline of programming languages

References

Reading
 
 

Procedural programming languages
OpenVMS software
Programming languages created in 1970
Programming languages
Digital Equipment Corporation